Richard Michael Harris Marriott (1926–1975) was a British public figure and economist, and a former head of the London Stock Exchange.

Career 
In 1975, Michael Marriott was head of the London Stock Exchange, Master of the Skinners Company, and President of the FESE.  He was the youngest master of the Skinners Company but also was one of the few to die whilst in office.  He died of a heart attack in 1975 aged 49 whilst holding all three of these positions.

Personal life 
Michael Marriott was born in 1926, Bromley, England. His mother, Olive Mason, was the sister of cricketers: Jack Mason, James Mason (cricketer), and Charles Mason. He was a distant cousin of Rugby Union player and England Captain Charles Marriott. Michael Marriott was an Old Tonbridgian (went to Tonbridge School) whom have subsequently named one of the school playing fields after him. His youngest son is the actor Tim Marriott of Brittas Empire Fame.

References 

People educated at Tonbridge School
1975 deaths
1926 births